The George Robbins House is a historic First Period house in Carlisle, Massachusetts.  Although construction of the oldest portions of this house generally ascribed to George Robbins in c. 1660–70, stylistic analysis of its construction methods places its date of construction to c. 1700.  It is a timber-frame house, five bays wide; its leanto is a late 18th-century addition, and the ell on the house's left dates to the 19th century, when some Greek Revival styling was added.

The house was listed on the National Register of Historic Places in 1990.

See also
List of the oldest buildings in Massachusetts
National Register of Historic Places listings in Middlesex County, Massachusetts

References

Houses on the National Register of Historic Places in Middlesex County, Massachusetts
Carlisle, Massachusetts